U.S. Bicycle Route 95 (USBR 95) is a U.S. Numbered Bicycle Route in California, Washington, and Alaska along the West Coast in the United States, that is also planned to run through Oregon. It has three designated sections in California, Washington, and Alaska. The first section, running from Valdez to Delta Junction in Alaska, was designated in May 2011.

Route description
The Alaska section, between Valdez and Delta Junction, was approved by the American Association of State Highway and Transportation Officials (AASHTO) in May 2011 as part of the first major expansion of the U.S. Bicycle Route System since 1982. It has connections to U.S. Bicycle Route 8 in Delta Junction and U.S. Bicycle Route 108 in Glennallen. USBR 95 is planned to eventually form a continuous link along the West Coast between San Diego and Alaska. 

The Washington section, connecting the Snohomish County Centennial Trail to the Peace Arch Border Crossing in Blaine, was designated in 2017. It includes two concurrencies with USBR 87 at its southern terminus and through the Bellingham area. The route also intersects USBR 10 in Burlington.

The California section, spanning , was designated in 2021 between San Francisco and the Oregon state line north of Crescent City, California. It generally follows U.S. Route 101.

References

External links

95
Bike paths in California
Bike paths in Washington (state)
Bike paths in Alaska